The Queets River is a river in the U.S. state of Washington. It is located on the Olympic Peninsula, mostly within the Olympic National Park and empties into the Pacific Ocean.

Its main tributaries include the Clearwater River, Salmon River, Sams River, Matheny Creek, and Tshetshy Creek, as well as the Clearwater's main tributaries, the Snahapish River and Solleks River.

History
According to Queets and Quinault legend, river was originally called K'witzqu or quitzqu, pronounced "Kw-ā-tz", meaning "out of the dirt of the skin". The legend tells of Kwate, the changer, or s'qitu, the Great Spirit and Transformer, came to the mouth of the Queets River. After fording the cold river he rubbed his legs to restore circulation, small rolls of dirt formed under his hand. He threw them into the water and from them a man and a woman came forth, who became the ancestors of the Queets people. Kwate told them they would remain on the river and would be known as K'witzqu, because of the dirt from which your skin was made. According to William Bright the river's name comes from the Quinault word /q'ʷícx̣ʷ/, meaning "dirt".

The name "Queets River" first appeared on the Surveyor General's map of Washington Territory and was later applied to other features. The word "Queets" was derived from the name of the Quai'tso tribe (Queets). Despite the name Queets River appearing on official maps, settlers called it Big River for many years, in contrast to its tributary the Clearwater River, which was called the Little River.

Course

The Queets River originates at the foot of the Humes Glacier on the southeast side of Mount Olympus in the Olympic Mountains. It is also fed by Jeffers Glacier, on the south side of Mount Olympus, and Queets Glacier, on the north side of Mount Queets. The river flows through a narrow canyon, cascading over Service Falls en route, to a point just below Paull Creek, where the valley opens up a bit. From there the river flows generally west to just below Kilkelly Creek, then south to just below Alta Creek, where the valley width expands once more into a typical U-shaped valley glacial river valley. The Queets then flows generally southwest, collecting numerous tributaries including the Clearwater River, Salmon River, and Sams River before emptying into the Pacific Ocean near the community of Queets.

Nearly all of the river is within Olympic National Park. The last  are outside the park, within the Quinault Indian reservation. A short portion of the river near its mouth is within Grays Harbor County while the rest is in Jefferson County.

Natural history
The Queets River is unusual in being a large river flowing through a relatively low-gradient, heavily forested alluvial valley. The forests on the western side of the Olympic Mountains have one of the highest rates of biomass production per unit area in North America. This combination results in frequent log jams and new channels. The river is not kept clear of woody debris, making it one of the few North American rivers of its size in which large log jams are common.

Recreation

There is a primitive National Park Service campground and ranger station (no longer staffed) at the end of the Queets River Road. Access to the trailhead requires fording the Queets River, which can be treacherous.
There are primitive campsites along the trail at the Lower Crossing Way Trail junction and Spruce Bottom.

The river is runnable by kayak or canoe from the campground to the Highway 101 bridge (roughly ), but is replete with hazards, mainly in the form of log jams.

See also
List of Washington rivers

References

External links
Upper Queets Valley Reopens Via Alternative Route, Olympic National Park, National Park Service

Rivers of Washington (state)
Rivers of Jefferson County, Washington
Washington placenames of Native American origin